AFO, or Assemblée de la francophonie de l'Ontario (Francophone Assembly of Ontario) is a Canadian organization which coordinates the political and cultural activities of the Franco-Ontarian community.

The organization was created in 1910 as the Association canadienne-française d'Éducation de l'Ontario (ACFÉO) to lobby for French language education rights in the province. The organization and the Franco-Ontarian community at large faced a serious early crisis when the provincial government adopted Regulation 17 in 1912, effectively banning the teaching of French in schools. The regulation was never fully implemented because of ACFÉO's litigation, and it was eventually repealed in 1927.

ACFÉO subsequently changed its name to Association canadienne-française de l'Ontario ("Association of French Canadians of Ontario"), or ACFO.

The organization continued to lobby for the improvement of French language services in the province. It was instrumental in the adoption of the French Language Services Act in 1986, and in the creation of Ontario's three francophone colleges: Collège La Cité in Ottawa, Collège Boréal in Sudbury and the defunct Collège des Grands-Lacs in Toronto. As well, ACFO lobbied against the provincial government's planned closure of Ottawa's Montfort Hospital.

In 2004, the organization changed its name to L'Assemblée de la francophonie de l'Ontario, partly to reflect Canadian francophones' modern shift away from identifying as French Canadian. In 2010 / 2011, their revenue was 1.4 million dollars. 1.2 million of that came from various government entities. The organization's current president is Carol Jolin.

Presidents 

1910-1912 - Napoléon Belcourt
1912-1914 - Charles-Siméon-Omer Boudreau
1914-1915 - Alphonse Télesphore Charron
1915-1919 - Philippe Landry
1919-1932 - Napoléon Belcourt
1932-1933 - Samuel Genest
1933-1934 - Léon-Calixte Raymond
1934-1938 - Dr. Paul-Émile Rochon
1938-1944 - Adélard Chartrand
1944-1953 - Ernest Desormeaux
1953-1959 - Gaston Vincent
1959-1963 - Aimé Arvisais
1963-1971 - Roger N. Séguin
1971-1972 - Ryan Paquette
1972-1974 - Omer Deslauriers
1974-1976 - Jean-Louis Bourdeau
1976-1978 - Gisèle Richer
1978-1980 - Jeannine Séguin
1980-1982 - Yves Saint-Denis
1982-1984 - André Cloutier
1984-1987 - Serge Plouffe
1987-1988 - Jacques Marchand (interim)
1988-1990 - Rolande Faucher
1990-1994 - Jean Tanguay
1994-1997 - André J. Lalonde
1997-1999 - Trèva Cousineau
1999-2001 - Alcide Gour
2001-2004 - Jean-Marc Aubin
2004-2005 - Jean Poirier
2005-2006 - Simon Lalande (interim)
2006-2010 - Mariette Carrier-Fraser
2010-2016 - Denis Vaillancourt
2016–present : Carol Jolin

External links 

 AFO

Civic and political organizations of Canada
Franco-Ontarian organizations
Franco-Ontarian history